The Meizu M8 is a Windows CE-based 3.4" smartphone. It is often regarded as having a Chinese iPhone-like design, with similar features and UI, running a version of Microsoft Windows CE 6 with a modified GUI similar to the iPhone. It was created after the success of Meizu's 2 MP3/MP4 players — the M6 Mini Player and the M3 Music Card. The phone was delayed several times due to not meeting Chinese cellular phone guidelines.

Announcement dates

CEO Jack Wong announced the Meizu M8 four days after the announcement of the iPhone, as a direct competitor. The product was set for a November release, but later released for public testing in April, 2007, in Shenzhen and Guangzhou, drawing positive reviews.

Specifications

Some expected specifications of the M8 (not final):

 Dimensions: 108 mm × 59 mm × 12 mm (H × W × T)
 Processor: Samsung ARM11 667 MHz CPU
 Display: 3.4-inch 16600K (OS 65536 colors), 720 × 480 pixel resolution, LTPS TFT LCD, with multi-touch (2 points)
 PC Interface: USB 2.0 Ultra-Fast Data Transfer
 Flash Memory: 8 or 16 GB of built-in basic Memory
 Operating System: Windows CE for Meizu M8 (Based on Windows CE6.0) (Mymobile)
 Video Playback: AVI, MP4, RM, RMVB, 3GP, MOV, ASF, WMV, MPEG, MKV, FLV, MPEG-4/H.263/H.264 at 30FPS

 Camera: 3.2 MP camera on the back. Supports auto-focus, and no flash.
 Battery: Removable 1200 mAh Li-ion

Support for

 GSM (850,900,1800, 1900 MHz), GPRS, EDGE, WiFi

Additional features

 The light sensor allows the phone to automatically adjust screen brightness in accordance with the lighting in the environment.
 Tilt and movement recognizing sensor that will allow it to auto-adjust screen orientation in accordance with tilting. It can also recognize movements (i.e. shaking), a feature that can be used for games.
 Proximity sensor for calling

CeBIT Appearance

Meizu appeared at CeBIT on March 4, 2008, with a non-functional, plastic prototype of the M8 able to display three screenshots of the UI, and a development board running a partially working UI with most common phone functions. No fully working unit was shown, however.

On the second day of the exhibition, March 5, German police raided 51 booths including Meizu, where a newly developed MP3 player thought to infringe a Fraunhofer Society patent was confiscated.

Production Halt

On October 9, 2010, it was reported that Meizu had shut down production of the M8 due to pressure from the Intellectual Property Offices and Apple Inc. because of its close similarities to the iPhone.  Apple also was looking to ban all sales of the M8 as well, which some media outlets have speculated could bankrupt the company due to losses from unsold inventory, but no official word on this has been heard.

See also

 Meizu M9
 Meizu MX
 Comparison of smartphones

References

External links
 Official Meizu M8 Website

Meizu smartphones
Mobile phones introduced in 2008
Portable media players
Windows CE devices
Discontinued smartphones